Red Kite Animation is a British animation production company based in Edinburgh, Scotland. The studio was founded in 1997 by Ken Anderson and Rachel Bevan Baker. The company developed the television cartoons Dennis the Menace and Gnasher and Wendy, and more recently the feature films Princess Emmy.

Filmography

Television series

2000s
 Catscratch (2005-2007) (Co-produced with Nickelodeon) IMP (2006)
 Dennis the Menace and Gnasher (2009–2013)

2010s
 Marvo the Wonder Chicken (2010) (Co-produced with Jetix Europe)
 Ask Lara (2011-2012)
 Wendy (2013)

 Feature films 

 Princess Emmy'' (2019)

References

External links 

British animation studios
1997 establishments in the United Kingdom